Ville Jalasto (born 19 April 1986) is a Finnish professional footballer who last played for the OBOS-ligaen side Kongsvinger as a centre-back.

Career

Club
Jalasto was born in Espoo, Finland. He made his Tippeligaen debut for Aalesund 13 April 2009 coming off the bench against Odd Grenland.

In August 2012, Jalasto joined Stabæk.

Jalasto left Stabæk on 21 December 2015, signing for HJK in his native Finland the next day.

International
Jalasto made his national team debut on 29 May 2010 in a friendly against Poland.

Career statistics

Club

References

1986 births
Living people
Footballers from Espoo
Association football central defenders
Finnish footballers
Finland international footballers
Finland under-21 international footballers
FC Honka players
Aalesunds FK players
Stabæk Fotball players
Veikkausliiga players
Eliteserien players
Norwegian First Division players
Finnish expatriate footballers
Expatriate footballers in Norway
21st-century Finnish people